Dumitru Hotoboc (born 23 December 1978) is a Romanian former professional footballer who played as a goalkeeper. He is currently goalkeeping coach of Chindia Târgoviște.

Honours
Jiul Petroșani
Divizia B: 2004–05
Divizia C: 2002–03

Argeș Pitești
Liga II: 2007–08

References

External links
 
 

1978 births
Living people
Sportspeople from Târgu Jiu
Romanian footballers
FC Politehnica Timișoara players
CSM Jiul Petroșani players
FC Steaua București players
FC Argeș Pitești players
FC U Craiova 1948 players
CS Turnu Severin players
ASC Oțelul Galați players
FC Politehnica Iași (2010) players
Liga I players
Liga II players
Association football goalkeepers